Jinju (born 4 July 1980), better known as Pearl, is a South Korean singer.

Career
On 17 December 1997, Pearl debuted under JYP Entertainment with the album Sunflower.

In 2015, Pearl competed in King of Mask Singer and became the 3rd generation mask king.

On 13 December 2017, Pearl released her fourth extended play, titled Sunflower, to commemorate her 20th anniversary since debut.

Since March 2018, Pearl has been working as a full-time Professor at Jeonghwa Arts University.

In 2020, Pearl participated as a contestant in Two Yoo Project – Sugar Man.

Discography
Studio albums
 Sunflower (17 December 1997)
 Jinju`s Soul Music (17 December 1999)
 LOVE IS... (1 March 2001)
 Chance (27 December 2001)

Extended plays
 Jinjoo & Wedding (22 November 2004)
 White (10 January 2008)
 Pearlfect (13 January 2009)
 Sunflower (13 December 2017)

Single albums
 Life Goes On (21 May 2007)
 Take My Hand OST Part 2 (29 January 2014)

Digital singles
 The Legend of Jinju (11 October 2006)
 Snow X-Mas (3 December 2008)
 Project Introduction – Follow & Plus (8 December 2010)
 Shout (4 October 2013)
 Home (1 October 2015)
 What A Friend We Have in Jesus (I Am Melody 3) (2 October 2015)
 Blessing of the Sea OST Part 3 (14 February 2019)

References

South Korean pop singers
People from Suwon
Living people
South Korean female idols
1980 births
JYP Entertainment artists